The 2016–17 season was Port Vale's 105th season of football in the English Football League, and fourth successive season in EFL League One. Vale finished in 21st place – one point from safety – and were relegated. The season covers the period from 1 July 2016 through to 30 June 2017.

The club underwent a complete transformation of the playing and managerial team, with 16 players coming in (plus two on loan) and 16 players going out over the course of the summer. Ten of the new arrivals came from European leagues outside the UK, and bookmakers predicted the club would be relegated, though chairman Norman Smurthwaite expected the team to push for the play-offs under the stewardship of new manager Bruno Ribeiro. Vale were knocked out of the EFL Cup by League Two side Carlisle United, and they failed to make it out of the group stages of the EFL Trophy as they were unable to score against League Two clubs Doncaster Rovers and Mansfield Town. Ribeiro, the club's first foreign manager, resigned on Boxing Day with the club languishing in 17th-place.

Assistant manager Michael Brown stepped in as caretaker-manager, but was unable to arrest Vale's slide down the table. The club had a poor January transfer window, losing top-scoring loanee striker Alex Jones, star goalkeeper Jak Alnwick, and reigning Player of the Year Anthony Grant. Despite failing to score in six of their final seven games, the fight against relegation went to the last day of the season at Fleetwood Town, but a 0–0 draw was not enough to escape the drop. After relegation was confirmed Smurthwaite announced that he was stepping down as chairman.

Overview

EFL League One
Following the decision of Rob Page to leave Port Vale to manage Northampton Town at the end of the 2015–16 campaign a number of names were linked with the Vale job. Chairman Norman Smurthwaite hinted of three "outstanding" candidates, which The Sentinel reported as being Brian Little, Paul Dickov, and José Morais. Bookmakers initially listed Michael Brown as the odds-on favourite, before switching to Morais, then Shefki Kuqi, and then Bruno Ribeiro. Ribeiro was appointed as manager on 20 June, with Michael Brown as his assistant, and Peter Farrell as first team coach. He made Dutch centre-back Kjell Knops his first signing of the season, who had spent the previous five years in the Eerste Divisie with MVV Maastricht. A day later, Curaçao under-20 striker Rigino Cicilia was signed after being released by Dutch side Roda JC Kerkrade. The next to join were French midfielders Quentin Pereira and Anthony de Freitas. Another Dutch-based centre-back, Calvin Mac-Intosch, was then signed from Cambuur.

The next trio to arrive were all Portuguese: midfielder Paulo Tavares and left-back Kiko, both from Vitória Setúbal, and striker Carlos Saleiro from Oriental. A ninth new arrival followed, Chris Mbamba, a Zimbabwean-born former Sweden under-17 international winger from Norwegian 2. divisjon club HamKam. A pair of English players then joined the club, former Premier League veteran winger Jerome Thomas and 22-year old former Blackburn Rovers forward Anton Forrester. Bookmakers made Vale second favourites for relegation, though Smurthwaite intimated that he expected the club to reach the play-offs. Andy Smith was confirmed as the club's new first team coach whilst the club decided to not hire Peter Farrell after all; Farrell only found out the news on his future after he heard it reported on the radio, and said "It would have been more respectful if someone had the decency to ring me up rather than leave it for 10 days". The club's Player of the Year, Anthony Grant, then submitted a transfer request. The playing squad however continued to grow, with a 12th signing, Monaco reserve team captain Sébastien Amoros, signing a 12-month contract. The signing of 20-year old midfielder Nathan Ferguson then took the club to 13 new players, and Ribeiro said he wanted to further expand the squad by securing the services of veteran trialist Nathan Tyson. However he lost a player, as right-back Adam Yates was ruled out of action for seven months with an ankle cruciate ligament injury. Ribeiro broke with tradition by naming three players as joint-captains: goalkeeper Jak Alnwick, veteran full-back Ben Purkiss, and star midfielder Anthony Grant.

Nine players made their debut for the club on the opening day of the season at Valley Parade, as Vale held Bradford City to a 0–0 draw. Ribeiro planned to strengthen his team further though, and was hopeful of signing another goalkeeper, striker, winger and left back. He achieved one of his targets by bringing in young Birmingham City striker Alex Jones on loan until January. Ribeiro went on to achieve his first win as Vale manager with a 2–0 victory over a poor Southend United side on 13 August. Despite only joining the club six weeks ago, Carlos Saleiro agreed to have his contract cancelled by mutual consent as he "found it difficult to adjust to life in the country". The good results kept coming though, and impressive young defender Nathan Smith scored a headed goal as Vale extending their run of league clean sheets to three games with a 1–0 win over Rochdale. In a bizarre revelation, The Sun newspaper reported that Mario Balotelli could join the Vale on loan; the story was ridiculed by local journalists and fans on social media. Vale conceded their first league goal in a 1–0 defeat at Swindon Town on 20 August, despite Ribeiro's view that Vale were the better side on the day. Northampton Town boss Rob Page was allowed to sign JJ Hooper on a five-month loan deal starting from 22 August, after the striker began the season on the right-wing for Vale. Later that night a grenade was found at Vale Park, which was later determined to be a training device from World War II. With Kiko and Yates both injured, Ribeiro signed Liverpool Academy left-back Sam Hart on a season-long loan. He also signed 29-year old former Northern Ireland striker Martin Paterson, who had been a free agent after leaving Blackpool. Vale continued their excellent start to the campaign by beating Scunthorpe United 3–1; substitutes Paterson, Hart and Amoros all made their first appearances for the club in the game, with the latter two players making their first appearances in professional football. Vale rounded off the month with two deadline day signings: Portuguese goalkeeper Miguel Santos from Benfica B and Swiss attacker Gëzim Shalaj from Enosis Neon Paralimni. Nathan Smith was named as the Football League Young Player of the Month for August.

Vale opened September by losing 4–1 to Bury in rain-soaked conditions at Gigg Lane; Ribeiro blamed himself for his players' poor performance, saying it was his job to instil the right attitude into the team before the match. Vale recovered and went on to claim a point at Peterborough United after Alex Jones converted a penalty in stoppage time to level the scores at 2–2. Visitors Gillingham led 1–0 at Vale Park on 17 September, before Vale turned round the game completely to achieve a 2–1 victory; manager Justin Edinburgh told the media that he believed the crowd had influenced the referee, to which Jerome Thomas responded on social media by displaying his bruised and bloodied shin. Vale then found themselves in the reverse situation at the Memorial Stadium, going from a 1–0 lead to an ultimate 2–1 defeat after Bristol Rovers equalised on 43 minutes. The perfect home form continued with a 3–1 victory over Millwall. Alex Jones was nominated for the EFL League One Player of the Month award for August and September after scoring six goals in eight games.

Coventry City manager Tony Mowbray resigned days before Coventry travelled to Vale Park for their fixture on 1 October. Vale were beaten 2–0 to lose their 100% home record and to give Coventry their first league win of the season. Vale's fixture at Milton Keynes Dons was shown live on Sky TV, and the Daily Mirror reported that Ribeiro paid £1,500 out of his own pocket to pay for a hotel stay for the team before the game as Smurthwaite refused to pay for the trip out of club funds. Smurthwaite refuted the newspaper's claim, saying he paid for the hotel accommodation out of his own pocket. The investment paid off as Vale scored their first goal at Stadium mk and recorded their first away victory of the season with a 1–0 win. However they then put in a poor performance at Bramall Lane, losing 4–0 to Sheffield United despite United having three goals disallowed. They seemed to be heading for another defeat at home to Charlton Athletic, before they managed a late comeback to achieve a 1–1 draw. Former Wigan Athletic and Newcastle United defender Ryan Taylor then joined the club on a short-term deal. He made his debut at home to Oxford United, and scored the equalising goal from the penalty spot as Vale came back from two goals down at half-time; Oxford had dominated the game in the first half before Vale initiated a more direct game plan in the second half. Vale could not repeat the feat after going 3–0 down at high-flying Bolton Wanderers after 16 minutes, though did manage to score a consolation goal to make the score a respectable 3–1.

Vale moved back into the play-offs on 12 November after coming from behind to beat Fleetwood Town 2–1 at Vale Park. Fleetwood boss Uwe Rösler said that "Port Vale rode their luck today and I look like Father Christmas so they got a gift today from us". However Grant was sent off for two bookable offences and suspended for a total of six games and fined £2,000 after he returned to the field after the match to argue with the referee on the full-time whistle. Vale then suffered a 2–0 defeat at Charlton, and dropped down to 11th-position. On 22 November, Vale came from behind at home to struggling Oldham Athletic to lead the game with a late strike from Cicilia, only for Oldham to score an equalising goal deep into stoppage time. They ended the month two points outside the play-offs after playing out a 0–0 draw with last-placed Shrewsbury Town.

Rob Page returned to Vale Park as manager of Northampton Town for the first time on 10 December, and masterminded a 3–2 victory to leapfrog the Vale, who sank to 15th-place. The poor form worsened with a 4–0 defeat at AFC Wimbledon that could have been much heavier without some fine goalkeeping from Alnwick. This caused Smurthwaite to declare that 'Plan B' had been triggered, meaning the signing of "seasoned, higher grade" players, whilst he admitted he felt "a little bit hoodwinked" as Ribeiro's friends in the game (José Mourinho, Aitor Karanka, and Carlos Carvalhal) had provided him with glowing references but had thus far failed to lend any of their players to the Vale. Out of form Walsall then inflicted a 1–0 Boxing Day defeat on the Vale. This proved to be too much for Ribeiro, who announced his resignation hours later; Michael Brown was placed in temporary charge. Brown's first match in charge was a 1–0 home victory over Chesterfield.

Vale opened the new year at bottom club Oldham Athletic, and Alnwick made some excellent saves to secure a 0–0 draw and a point which moved the Vale two places up the table. However Brown stated that the player's fitness rates were so low they were "alarming". Having allowed Santos and Hart to leave the club, Brown then signed veteran midfielder Chris Eagles on a short-term contract, and brought in 20-year loanee Callum Guy in from Derby County and 20-year striker Tyler Walker on loan from Nottingham Forest. Ryan Boot made his debut in goal and Eagles, Guy and Walker also made their debuts in a 2–2 home draw with Bury on 20 January; Walker scored the opening goal whilst Guy was named as man of the match. Brown went on to make a fourth signing in Rochdale full-back Scott Tanser. Vale twice took the lead away at high-flying Scunthorpe United, but went on to lose the game 3–2 with a penalty which Brown said had "never been a penalty in a million years". Brown further added to squad by signing 19-year old Queens Park Rangers midfielders Olamide Shodipo and Axel Prohouly on loan until the end of the season. However Rangers triggered Alnwick's £250,000 release clause, and his departure left the Vale without arguably their player of the season so far. Vale also sold reigning Player of the Year Anthony Grant to Peterborough United for an undisclosed "six-figure fee". Brown completed Vale's January transfer window by signing veteran midfielder Danny Pugh and bringing in goalkeeper Leo Fasan on loan from Celtic.

Vale welcomed back Grant with Peterborough United on 4 February – Fasan, Shodipo and Pugh all made their Vale debuts – and were beaten, 3–0, despite Fasan's man-of-the-match performance and his saving a penalty. Youth team goalkeeper Joe Slinn went on to turn professional at the club, becoming the fifth goalkeeper on the club's books. A Remie Streete header seemed to have handed Vale a comfortable win at Gillingham, but a Josh Parker header five minutes into injury time levelled the game at 1–1. Streete then fractured his leg in a 2–0 defeat at Millwall, as Vale dropped to just one place above the relegation zone. A 1–1 home draw with Bristol Rovers then allowed Bury to overtake Vale to leave Vale in the relegation zone for the first time in the season; the injury also crisis worsened as Walker left the pitch with a serious knee injury. Bradford City then came to Burslem to claim three points, with Alex Jones scoring his first goal in Bradford colours to make the final score 2–1. A waterlogged pitch at Rochdale on 28 February left the Vale powerless to prevent Swindon overtaking them and other relegation rivals to pick up points; Vale entered March five points from safety but with three game in hand.

Brown signed Vale's eighth goalkeeper of the season on 1 March after former Turkey youth international Deniz Mehmet agreed to a short-term contract. Vale then travelled to play-off chasing Southend United, and picked up a useful point after grinding out a 1–1 draw despite losing Pugh and Thomas to injury and having to hand a debut to youth team graduate Billy Reeves. Vale came from one goal down to record an important 3–2 victory at home to relegation rivals Swindon Town on 11 March. However they went on to lose 2–1 at Northampton Town three days later – a damaging defeat as the two teams directly above the relegation zone (Bury and Oldham) both won to leave Vale five points short of safety. Brown acted on 17 March by bringing in former Cameroon international defender André Bikey and re-signing Ryan Taylor on contracts running until the end of the season. Later that evening Taylor provided an assist and scored a goal as Vale claimed a crucial 2–1 home win over relegation rivals Shrewsbury Town. Vale had the chance to exit the relegation zone on 21 March, but put in a poor performance at the Ricoh Arena and conspired to become the only team to lose home and away to bottom club Coventry City that season. They missed another opportunity to overtake Shrewsbury in 20th-place four days later after playing out a 0–0 draw at home to MK Dons in front of a crowd of just 3,877.

Vale beat Wimbledon, 2–0, on 1 April to overtake Shrewsbury, Gillingham and Oldham and finish the day in 18th place. However they lost 3–0 at Rochdale three days later, losing Pugh to a red card and Knops to a serious knee injury. Vale then suffered a 1–0 defeat at Chesterfield, which dropped them back into the relegation zone. League leaders Sheffield United ran out comfortable 3–0 winners in front of a season high 8,999 crowd – 4,330 of which were United fans – at Vale Park on Good Friday. Vale put in a decent performance away at Oxford United, but lost the game 2–0 after individual errors from Mehmet and then Smith handed easy chances to the home side. Bolton Wanderers were Vale's final home opponents of the season in an eventful and disastrous game on 22 April, Cicilia was sent off in the first half for two bookable offences, and as Bolton took the lead after 66 minutes a pitch invasion from the away fans sparked a clash between both sets of fans as the players left the field whilst police restored order; the players returned to see out a 2–0 away win, and other results went against the Vale to leave them needing to win their final two games to stand any chance of survival. A late Chris Eagles strike at Walsall gave the Vale a 1–0 victory to keep their survival fight going until the final day of the season. In order to retain their League One status Vale had to beat Fleetwood on the final day and rely on either Gillingham failing to win at Northampton or Bury failing to pick up a point at Southend. Third-place Fleetwood were difficult opponents however, as they needed a win to stand a chance of securing automatic promotion, and manager Uwe Rosler said they "have to settle the score" after losing at Vale Park in November. Gillingham and Bury both dropped points, but Vale failed to take advantage a they saw out a 0–0 draw with Fleetwood.

Brown decided to release 10 players at the end of the season: Sébastien Amoros, Remie Streete, JJ Hooper, Sam Johnson, Sam Kelly, Ryan Lloyd, Deniz Mehmet, Harry Pickering, Scott Tanser, and Jerome Thomas; he also arranged deals with Rigino Cicilia, Kiko, Chris Mbamba, Quentin Pereira, and Paulo Tavares so that those five players could leave their contracts early. Sam Foley also left the club after rejecting the offer of a new contract. Ben Purkiss was the next to leave after he elected to join Swindon Town.

Finances & ownership issues
The club sold 3,344 season tickets, priced as low as £345 for adults, for the 2016–17 season; match day tickets were £23. Smurthwaite stated that the playing budget was around £1.3 million. A Norwegian hedge fund signed an exclusivity deal in view of purchasing the club on 16 June 2016. Smurthwaite stated that the hedge fund ended their interest after meeting with Ribeiro. Smurthwaite renewed his dispute with The Sentinel by banning the newspaper from attending the club's press conference where Ribeiro was unveiled as the club's new manager. He went on to appoint Colin Garlick as the club's CEO, and in January stated that "I'm only really involved now when it comes to prising open the sweetie jar for the money". In March, Smurthwaite used the OneValeFan fansite to ask supporters to vote whether he should sell the club to one of two hedge funds that he said had met his asking price for the club. The Sentinel revealed one interested party was a Norwegian company who proposed a sale figure of £6.5 million based on a valuation of Vale Park at £10 million, the playing squad at £5 million and expected crowds of 20,000 in the Championship. Smurthwaite said this information had been leaked by "some long standing fans" he had consulted for advice. He went on to issue a statement apologizing for his decision to appoint Ribeiro and expressing regret at his attempts to communicate with fans over social media. He said there would be no further dialogue over social media, though "sadly I do not think this will change the activities of the keyboard warriors but at least they will now know that I will not be reading or responding to it".

Smurthwaite issued a statement on 2 May apologising for relegation, and stated that he would be stepping down as chairman and would no longer attend games as he looked to sell the club. Three days later, Burslem-based IT company Synectics Solutions's husband and wife owners Carol and Kevin Shanahan went public to announce they had made a bid of £1.25 million for the club. This bid was quickly matched by a local consortium fronted by property developer Kevin Jones, the owner and managing director of both ManorShop and ICL (International Computer Logistics) of Kidsgrove. Smurthwaite rejected both offers, saying that "I do not anticipate any further dialogue with either party with regard to the sale."

In April 2018, it was revealed that Port Vale had made a profit of £466,343 over the course of the 2016–17 season, due in part to £390,000 in player sales and £100,000 in exclusivity payments.

Cup competitions
Vale faced a home tie with League Two side Stevenage in the First Round of the FA Cup, and managed to progress by edging a narrow game 1–0, but were booed off by sections of the home support. Witnessed by a crowd of just 3,093 (only 173 of which were Stevenage fans), this was Vale's lowest attendance for a home FA Cup tie since 1906; this was despite ticket prices being almost halved to £12 on the day. They then cruised to a 4–0 victory at home to League Two side Hartlepool United to make it into the Third Round. Huddersfield Town, fourth in the Championship, proved far superior to the Vale in the Third Round, as they cruised to a 4–0 win at the John Smith's Stadium.

Vale were drawn away to League Two club Carlisle United in the First Round of the newly re-branded EFL Cup, and lost the game 2–1 after conceding two goals in a poor first half. In his post-match interview Ribeiro criticised his team's work rate, and said that "I am very disappointed with my players."

In the EFL Trophy, Vale were drawn in Northern Group E with Derby County under-23s, Doncaster Rovers (League Two), Mansfield Town (League Two). Only 1,198 spectators turned out to witness the opening victory over Derby County U23 – the second lowest ever attendance for a competitive fixture at Vale Park – as a Nathan Smith header secured a 1–0 win, though coach Andy Smith criticised the players for putting in a low-tempo performance. They went on to lose 1–0 at home to Mansfield Town in front of an even lower crowd of 1,075 – 29 more than the lowest ever attendance at Vale Park. Vale then failed to beat Doncaster, and were eliminated from the competition despite winning the penalty shoot-out that resulted from the 0–0 draw.

Results

Pre-season

EFL League One

League table

Results by matchday

Matches

FA Cup

EFL Cup

EFL Trophy

Squad statistics

Appearances and goals

Top scorers

Disciplinary record

Sourced from Soccerway.

Awards

Transfers

Transfers in

Transfers out

Loans in

Loans out

References

Port Vale F.C. seasons
Port Vale